Halfway is a small, unincorporated hamlet in Fauquier County, Virginia, running along State Route 626, known as Halfway Road.  The hamlet is named so for its equidistant location between the towns of Middleburg and The Plains.  It is home to a local vineyard and winery, and carries The Plains' ZIP Code of 20198. Wide usage of Halfway is now quite uncommon, except by residents within neighboring towns.  The area is usually considered to be part of The Plains, although a small sign still stands noting that the area is known as Halfway. The post office and general store no longer exist there.

References

Unincorporated communities in Fauquier County, Virginia
Unincorporated communities in Virginia